The 17th Genie Awards were held on November 27, 1996, to honour films released in late 1995 and 1996. They were the second Genie Award ceremony held in that year; the 16th Genie Awards were delayed from the fall of 1995 and took place in January 1996 instead.

Nominees and winners
Winners and nominees were:

References

External links 
Genie Awards 1996 on imdb

17
Genie
Genie